The first municipal council in the capital city of Jordan, Amman, was established in 1909.

References

Amman